The Cladonychiidae are a small family of harvestman with about 33 described species, within the suborder Laniatores.

Description
Members of this family range from less than two to about four millimeters in body length, with robust, spined pedipalps and rather short legs, although the second pair can be as long as two centimeter. Most Cladonychiidae are reddish brown to dark brown, but cave-dwelling species are pale yellow. Not all species have eyes.

Distribution
The members of Cladonychiidae are found in Southern Europe and the United States.

Fossils
Proholoscotolemon was recently found in Baltic amber.

Relationships
The genera Peltonychia, Holoscotolemon, Erebomaster, Theromaster, Speleonychia, Briggsus, and
Isolachus from the family Travuniidae and the former family Pentanychidae have been transferred to Cladonychiidae. This left Travuniidae with three genera from the Balkan region of Europe, Travunia, Trojanella, and Dinaria.

Name
The name of the former type genus Cladonychium (now synonymized with Erebomaster)  is derived from Ancient Greek "branched claw".

Species
These genera and species belong to the family Cladonychiidae:

 genus Arbasus Roewer, 1935
 species Arbasus caecus (Simon, 1911)
 genus Briggsus Özdikmen & Demir, 2008
 species Briggsus bilobatus (Briggs, 1971)
 species Briggsus clavatus (Briggs, 1971)
 species Briggsus flavescens (Briggs, 1971)
 species Briggsus hamatus (Briggs, 1971)
 species Briggsus pacificus (Briggs, 1971)
 genus Buemarinoa Roewer, 1956
 species Buemarinoa patrizii Roewer, 1956
 genus Erebomaster Cope, 1872
 species Erebomaster acanthinus (Crosby & Bishop, 1924)
 species Erebomaster flavescens Cope, 1872
 subspecies Erebomaster flavescens flavescens Cope, 1872
 subspecies Erebomaster flavescens coecum (Packard, 1888) — Carter cave
 species Erebomaster weyerensis (Packard, 1888)
 genus Holoscotolemon Roewer, 1915
 species Holoscotolemon franzinii Tedeschi & Sciaky, 1994
 species Holoscotolemon jaqueti (Corti, 1905)
 species Holoscotolemon lessiniense Martens, 1978
 species Holoscotolemon lessiniensis Martens, 1978
 species Holoscotolemon monzinii Tedeschi & Sciaky, 1994
 species Holoscotolemon naturae Tedeschi & Sciaky, 1994
 species Holoscotolemon oreophilus Martens, 1978
 species Holoscotolemon querilhaci (Lucas, 1864)
 species Holoscotolemon unicolor Roewer, 1915
 genus Isolachus Briggs, 1971
 species Isolachus spinosus Briggs, 1971
 genus Peltonychia Roewer, 1935
 species Peltonychia clavigera (Simon, 1879)
 species Peltonychia gabria Roewer, 1935
 species Peltonychia leprieuri (Lucas, 1861)
 species Peltonychia leprieurii
 species Peltonychia navarica (Simon, 1879)
 species Peltonychia piochardi (Simon, 1872)
 species Peltonychia postumicola (Roewer, 1935)
 species Peltonychia sarea (Roewer, 1935)
 species Peltonychia tenuis Roewer, 1935
 genus Speleonychia Briggs, 1974
 species Speleonychia sengeri Briggs, 1974
 genus Theromaster Briggs, 1969
 species Theromaster archeri (Goodnight & Goodnight, 1942)
 species Theromaster brunneus (Banks, 1902)
 genus † Proholoscotolemon Ubick & Dunlop, 2005
 species † Proholoscotolemon nemastomoides (Koch & Berendt, 1854)

Footnotes

References

  (eds.) (2007): Harvestmen - The Biology of Opiliones. Harvard University Press 

Harvestman families
Extant Eocene first appearances
Harvestmen